The 9th Vijay Awards ceremony honouring the best of the Tamil film industry in 2014 was held on 25 April 2015 at Chennai. The event was hosted by Gopinath and Divyadharshini.

Jury 
R Balki, K. Bhagyaraj, Yugi Sethu, KV Anand and Nadhiya Moidu are the juries of 9th Edition Vijay Awards.

Winners and nominees 
Source:

Jury awards 

Special Jury Awards
 Soundarya Rajinikanth – Kochadaiyaan
 Studio Green – Madras

Favorite awards

References

External links 
 

Vijay Awards
2015 Indian film awards